Adi Karnataka refers to a group of people who are indigenous to Karnataka, India.

Adi Karnataka is a social group in Karnataka Gazette.

The Ministry of Home Affairs (MHA) uses the term 'Adi Karnataka' while referring to one group of the Kannadiga aboriginals who are indigenous to the state of Karnataka. In the mid-1830s, a British traveller named Kristopher Fellowman made considerable research on the community which is also called 'Samantha' and 'moola kannadiga kula'---once a wealthy one and belonging to the upper caste in Kshatriya's Kula (a ruling caste status of kings) centuries ago.

The Samanthas divided their roles and responsibilities into 'Edgai' and 'Balgai' sub-groups, which translated into left and right hands, respectively. While the Balgais comprised monarchs and administrators, the Edgais (<artisan>)were made responsible for work like farming, hunting and state's security.

The Adi Karnataka's strength started weakening around the middle of the 17th century, thanks to the political rise of various Kashtriya communities. During the British rule, the foreigners allegedly joined hands with the Patils and Gowdas to defeat the Adi Karnataka clan and the number of its members got reduced alarmingly. In the early 19th century, the Samanthas were stripped of property rights and even driven out of their settlements and forced to live in caves and forests. Their women and children were forced into slavery after the males were killed and the practice continued well into India's dependence. Many women, who still had some wealth, were forcibly married off in Gowda and Patil communities. Several communities still continue with the practices of the Adi Karnatakac clan.

After Indepenece, when the Government of India undertook a survey to identify the castes, they found the Adi Karnataka to be an endangered community and it was awarded the Schedule Caste status inorder to prevent the group from declining in numbers.

Present day
The cultural practices of this dynasty are supported by Gowda, Kuruba, Okkaliga, and Patil communities. Many families from Malur, Hosur, Krishnagiri, Denkanakote, Kanakapura, Mysore, Mandya, Magadi and Hassan districts holdthe  AK dynasty's silver coins and artifacts with emblems.

In 1950, after Independence, a government survey was taken to segregate the states and caste. Owing to their poverty, reduced numbers and unique lineage, the Government decided to include Adi-Karnataka as a distinct caste and awarded them Scheduled Caste status from their Kshatriya class.

See also
Caste system in India

References

General references

External links
 

Kannada people
Karnataka society
Social groups of Karnataka